The 2018–19 Tahiti Ligue 1 is the 72nd season of the Tahiti Ligue 1, the top-flight football league in Tahiti. The season started on 28 September 2018. A.S. Central Sport are the defending champions.

Team changes

To Ligue 1 Vini

Promoted from 2017 to 2018 Ligue 2
 A.S. Arue
 A.S. Jeunes Tahitiens

Promoted from Ligue 2 Moorea
 A.S. Tiare Tahiti

Relegated to 2018–19 Ligue 2
 AS Aorai
 A.S. Tamarii Punaruu

Excluded
 Tahiti U-19

Teams

A total of ten teams compete in the league.

Stadium and locations
Note: Table lists in alphabetical order.

Personnel and sponsoring
Note: Flags indicate national team as has been defined under FIFA eligibility rules. Players may hold more than one non-FIFA nationality.

League table

Relegation playoff
The winner of the relegation playoff between Arue (Ligue 1 9th place) and Olympique de Mahina (Ligue 2 2nd place) earned a place in the 2019–20 Tahiti Ligue 1.

Olympique de Mahina were promoted; Arue were relegated.

Top scorers

Hat-tricks

References

External links 
 Fédération Tahitienne de Football
 FIFA
 Sports Tahiti

Tahiti Ligue 1 seasons
Tahiti
Tahiti
1